The Southern Miss Golden Eagles baseball team has represented The University of Southern Mississippi over 104 seasons, dating back to its inception in 1913. The Golden Eagles are a founding member of Conference USA.

Year-by-Year

References

Southern Miss Golden Eagles baseball